Minsal Airport is a high elevation airport serving the mineral salt mining operations on the Salar de Atacama salt flat, in the Antofagasta Region of Chile.

See also

Transport in Chile
List of airports in Chile

References

External links
OpenStreetMap - Minsal
FallingRain - Minsal Airport

Airports in Chile
Airports in Antofagasta Region